Davsha (Dabshaa) is a rural locality (a settlement) in Severo-Baykalsky District, Republic of Buryatia, Russia. The population was 18 as of 2010.

Geography 
Davsha is located 1,585 km south of Nizhneangarsk (the district's administrative centre) by road. Kurumkan is the nearest rural locality.

References 

Rural localities in Severo-Baykalsky District
Populated places on Lake Baikal